Nasrullah is a village in Silifke district of Mersin Province, Turkey. The population of the village was 41 as of 2012, which makes it one of the least populous villages of Mersin Province. as of 2012. The main economic activity is farming.

References

Villages in Silifke District